Kesab Chandra Gogoi (29 September 1925 – 5 August 1998) was an Indian politician who was the Chief Minister of the state of Assam for two months in 1982. For most of his political career, he was a member of Indian National Congress. He was a finance minister in the Assam state cabinet twice and a member of the Assam Legislative Assembly from Dibrugarh constituency.

Gogoi was born into a family of Tai-Ahom. He was married to Shanti Gogoi in 1951. His wife was the daughter of Padma Kumari Gohain, one of the first female MLAs in Assam, as well as one of the first female state ministers in Assam. His wife was also the daughter of Jogesh Chandra Borgohain, who was an MLC in the 1930s. Gogoi was an advocate at Gauhati High Court and a practitioner in Dibrugarh district court, as well as being a social worker before his entry to politics.

Gogoi became the MLA for Dibrugarh for the Janata Party in 1978. He became a minister in the Golap Borbora and Jogendra Nath Hazarika cabinets, before switching to congress where he then became a finance minister under Anwara Taimur. He was made Chief Minister of Assam on 13 January 1982, but he later resigned amid a motion of no confidence vote. He later became a minister in the Hiteswar Saikia cabinet before he was removed for alleged anti-party activities. His political career ended in the year 1996 and he died in 1998.

Gogoi had 5 children with Shanti Gogoi including Anjan and Ranjan. His son Anjan is a retired Air Marshal in the Indian Air Force. His son, Ranjan Gogoi, became the 46th Chief Justice of India and is presently a Member of the Rajya Sabha.

Early life and education 
Gogoi was born in a family of Tai-Ahom on 29 September 1925. Gogoi had a B.A and LLB.

Political career 

Gogoi was elected to Assam Legislative Assembly in 1978 as a Janata Party candidate in Dibrugarh. He received 22003 votes, 57.84% of the total vote and defeated his nearest opponent by 11930 votes. He became a Minister for Finance, Judicial, Legislative (Law) in the Golap Borbora cabinet. On 14 July 1979, Borbora reconstituted his ministry. The re-allocation of portfolios saw the exit of two senior cabinet members, one being Gogoi. After the Borbora ministry collapsed, Gogoi went over to Jogendra Nath Hazarika's group and became a cabinet minister during Jogendra Nath Hazarika's chief ministership.

With the 1980 Indira Gandhi wave, he joined the Indian National Congress and became Minister of Finance, Power, Steel and Mines and Parliamentary Affairs in the Anwara Taimur cabinet. He served until 1981.

Chief Ministership 

President N Sanjiva Reddy issued a proclamation revoking President's rule imposed on Assam on 30 June 1981, and extending for another term of six months. The President's rule was imposed when the government of Anwara Taimur failed to get the Assam appropriation bill passed by the assembly. Gogoi became one of the Chief Ministers of Assam on 13 January 1982, ending 197 days of President's rule in Assam. Just before his selection, 4 supporters of Anwara Taimur resigned from the party. However, Taimur proposed Gogoi for the leadership, as did future Chief Minister Hiteswar Saika. Earlier, the Taimur camp had encouraged Saikia to contest Gogoi's claim but an opinion poll before the final selection showed there were only 8 backers of Saikia among the 35 partymen assembled while 24 supported Gogoi and 3 remained neutral.

Gogoi told the press a day before his swearing-in that he had backing of 63 out of 125 members of the Assembly. Minutes after it was known that the Governor, Prakash Mehrotra, had accepted Gogoi's claim, Gogoi was sworn in a ceremony at Raj Bhavan. Gogoi said that he was giving top priority to the solution of the foreigners issue and the maintenance of law and order. Gogoi allocated himself the ministries of home, administration reforms, public relations, khadi and village industries, rural development, public works, tourism and all other departments not allocated.

During his tenure, he gave more emphasis on the implementation of National Rural Employment Scheme. He also emphasised the 20 point programmes launched by Indira Gandhi.

On 17 March 1982 a Motion of No Confidence was moved against the 65-day-old ministry of Gogoi. The motion was moved against Gogoi jointly by Sarat Chandra Singha, Golap Borbora, Hemen Das, Promode Gogoi, Zainal Abedin, Premadhar Bora and Romesh Mohan Kouli. The speaker admitted the motion and fixed the discussion for 18 March 1982. However, the speaker adjourned the house sine die after he received a message stating that Gogoi tendered in his resignation to the Governor. On 19 March, the President Sanjiva Reddy then issued a proclamation which dissolved the legislative assembly and brought the state under President's rule.

Post-Chief Ministership 
In the 1983 Assam Legislative Assembly election, he was reelected, polling 4905 votes as the Congress candidate in Dibrugarh. He was PWD minister in the Hiteswar Saikia cabinet from 1983 to 1985.

In the 1985 Assam Legislative Assembly election, Gogoi received 24100 votes, 44.87% of the total vote and he was reelected in Dibrugarh, defeating his nearest opponent by 4055 votes.

In the 1991 Assam Legislative Assembly election, he received 20278 votes, 42.38% of the total vote. He was reelected and he defeated his nearest opponent by 9070 votes. He was made minister for Planning and Development in the second Hiteswar Saikia ministry on 30 June 1991. On 18 October 1991, Gogoi was given charge of Public Enterprises. On 27 November 1992, he was removed from the Cabinet for alleged anti-party activities. He remained MLA for Dibrugarh until 1996, where he did not get the congress nomination. He instead was the All India Indira Congress (tiwari) candidate but came 4th in the election, losing his seat to Kalyan Kumar Gogoi.

Personal life 

Gogoi enjoyed indoor games, reading, gardening and cultivation. He married Smt Shanti Priya Gogoi (née Borgohain; 30 August 1934 - 9 April 2021) in 1951 and they had 5 children; Anjan Gogoi, Ranjan Gogoi, Nirjan Gogoi, Indira Gogoi and Nandita Hazarika. His wife was the daughter of Jogesh Chandra Borgohain and Padma Kumari Gohain. Padma Kumari Gohain was the Member of the Assam Legislative Assembly for Moran and was a minister in the Bimala Prasad Chaliha and Mahendra Mohan Choudhury’s cabinets. His eldest son Anjan Kumar Gogoi, went on to become Air Marshal in the Indian Air Force. His son Justice Ranjan Gogoi was the 46th chief justice of the Supreme Court of India. His son Nirjan is a Consultant Urologist in the United Kingdom and his two daughters, Indira and Nandita, were members of the Assam civil service until their retirement recently.

Death 
Kesab Chandra Gogoi died on 5 August 1998 in Dibrugarh, at the age of 72. He was survived by his wife, children and grandchildren.

His wife, Shanti Gogoi, died on 9 April 2021 after a short illness at a hospital at Escorts Hospital, New Delhi due to age related ailments. Her mortal remains were later brought back to Dibrugarh where the former CJI and her son Ranjan Gogoi performed her last rites. Many admirers and politicians paid tributes. Chief Minister Sarbananda Sonowal, cabinet ministers Atul Bora and Keshab Mahanta offered condolences to Shanti Gogoi at her residence in Dibrugarh.

References 

Chief Ministers of Assam
Indian National Congress politicians
Members of the Assam Legislative Assembly
Chief ministers from Indian National Congress
1925 births
1998 deaths
All India Indira Congress (Tiwari) politicians
Janata Party politicians
State cabinet ministers of Assam